The Bu Hasa Oil Field is an oil field in Abu Dhabi. It was discovered in 1962 and developed by Abu Dhabi Petroleum Company. The oil field is owned by Abu Dhabi National Oil Company and operated by Abu Dhabi Company for Onshore Oil Operations.

References 

Oil fields of the United Arab Emirates